The Canon of Trent is the list of books officially considered canonical at the Roman Catholic Council of Trent. A decree, the De Canonicis Scripturis, from the Council's fourth session (of 8 April 1546), issued an anathema on dissenters of the books affirmed in Trent. The Council confirmed an identical list already locally approved in 1442 by the Council of Florence (Session 11, 4 February 1442), which had existed in the earliest canonical lists from the synods of Carthage and Rome in the fourth century.

The list confirmed that the deuterocanonical books were on a par with the other books of the canon (while Luther placed these books in the Apocrypha of his canon) and ended debate on the Antilegomena and coordinated church tradition with the Scriptures as a rule of faith. It also affirmed Jerome's Latin translation, the Vulgate, to be authoritative for the text of Scripture, contrary to Protestant views that the Greek and Hebrew texts were more authoritative. Later, on 3 September 1943, Pope Pius XII issued the encyclical Divino afflante Spiritu, which allowed Catholic translations to be based on texts other than the Latin Vulgate.

List

Old Testament

New Testament

References

External links
 

16th-century Christian texts
Christian terminology
Christian theology of the Bible
 
Counter-Reformation
Development of the Christian biblical canon